A Toot and a Snore in '74 is a bootleg album consisting of the only known recording session in which John Lennon and Paul McCartney played together after the break-up of the Beatles in 1970.  First mentioned by Lennon in a 1975 interview, more details were brought to light in May Pang's 1983 book, Loving John, and it gained wider prominence when McCartney made reference to the session in a 1997 interview. Talking with Australian writer Sean Sennett in his Soho office, McCartney said the "session was hazy... for a number of reasons".

Recording history
Lennon was producing Harry Nilsson's album Pussy Cats, when Paul and Linda McCartney dropped in after the first night of the sessions, a.k.a. "the Jim Keltner Fan Club Hour", at Burbank Studios on 28 March 1974. They were joined by Nilsson, Stevie Wonder, Jesse Ed Davis, May Pang, Mal Evans, Bobby Keys and producer Ed Freeman for an impromptu jam session.

Lennon was separated from Yoko Ono and living in Los Angeles with Pang in a period of his life popularly referred to as his "lost weekend". Although he and McCartney had not seen each other in three years and had lashed out at each other in the press, according to Pang they resumed their friendship as if nothing had happened.  The jam session proved not very productive musically. Lennon sounds to be on cocaine and is heard offering Wonder a snort on the first track, then asking someone to give him a snort on the fifth. This is also the origin of the album title, where John Lennon clearly asks: "You wanna snort, Steve? A toot? It's goin' round". In addition, Lennon seems to be having trouble with his microphone and headphones.

Lennon is on lead vocal and guitar, and McCartney sings harmony and plays Ringo Starr's drums (Starr, who was recording with Nilsson at the time but not present at the session, complained at the next day's recording session that "[McCartney] always messes up my drums!"). Stevie Wonder sings and plays electric piano, Linda McCartney is on organ, Pang plays tambourine, Nilsson provides vocals, Davis is on guitar, Freeman (who was producing Don McLean in the neighboring studio) fills in on bass, and Keys plays saxophone.  Keys was questioned a number of times about the session, but could not recall any of it.

It remains the only known instance of Lennon and McCartney playing together after 1970. Aside from informal, special occasions such as weddings, collaborations of more than two ex-Beatles have been rare since the band's 1969–70 split.

Track listing
"A Toot and a Snore" – 0:27
"Bluesy Jam" – 2:33
"Studio Talk" – 2:40 
 The group plays a few bars of "Little Bitty Pretty One" by Thurston Harris, and John sings the first line but says he can't remember any more
"Lucille" – 5:59
"Nightmares" – 2:38
 Actually the band is playing "Sleep Walk", the 1959 Santo & Johnny instrumental hit.
"Stand By Me" – 2:18 
 Mostly Lennon complaining about the sound in his headphones and reminiscing about how it was better half an hour ago.
"Stand By Me" – 3:41 
 Lennon complains about the sound again, saying that it was better two hours ago.
"Stand By Me" – 6:04 
Because of Lennon's complaints, the studio has changed the microphone levels on the recording itself (rather than the performers' headphones), and most of his lead vocals can no longer be heard. 
Medley – 3:10
After the general chaos of the Lennon-led session, Stevie Wonder tries steering the group into the following medley. 
"Cupid"
"Chain Gang"
"Take This Hammer"

Personnel
in alphabetical order:
Jesse Ed Davis – guitar
Mal Evans – tambourine
Ed Freeman – bass
Bobby Keys – saxophone
John Lennon – guitar, vocals
Linda McCartney – organ
Paul McCartney – drums, vocals
Harry Nilsson – vocals
May Pang – tambourine
Stevie Wonder – electric piano, vocals (mostly on "Cupid")

Linda McCartney and Freeman are not credited on the bootleg's back cover. After the musicians, Mal Evans is credited with "Tea" and Pang with "Sympathy."

Artwork
The album's front cover is based on Revolver, the back cover of Imagine, and the 1979 compilation album The Songs Lennon and McCartney Gave Away.

References

1992 albums
Bootleg recordings
John Lennon albums
Paul McCartney albums